Cecil Alec Mace (22 July 1894 – 7 June 1971) usually cited as C.A. Mace, was a British philosopher and industrial psychologist. He is best known for his work on monetary incentives and goal setting theory.

Life
Mace was born on 22 July 1894 to Mary and Walter Mace in Norwich, England. He left home at 18 for Cambridge University, intending to study for holy orders. However, instead he chose to read Moral Sciences at Queens' College, Cambridge. He studied under the philosopher G.E. Moore. The British psychologist Charles Samuel Myers, who started the first experimental psychology laboratory in Cambridge, was another mentor.

At the outbreak of World War I, Mace who shared Moore's pacifism, refused to fight. Instead he was sent to Dartmoor prison where he studied the psychological effects of imprisonment. Following the war, he was appointed Lecturer in Philosophy and Psychology at the University of Nottingham. He married Marjorie Lebus in 1922 and they had two sons.

In 1925, he joined St Andrews University to start an experimental psychology laboratory. He introduced the first courses in experimental psychology and set up a laboratory in 1927.

In 1932, he became a Reader a Bedford College, London. He worked under the direction of Professor Beatrice Edgell, the first woman President of the British Psychological Society.

During World War II, Mace was appointed a Head of Psychology at King's College, London. The department was transferred to Birkbeck in 1944 and Mace became the first Birkbeck Chair of Psychology, a position he retired from in 1961. Mace died on 9 June 1971.

Influence
Mace's work on Incentives: Some Experimental Studies (1935) discredited the notion that workers are primarily incentivized by money. He also stated that people have a "will to work." In 1935, he conducted the first empirical studies of goal setting.
His most influential books were Sibylla; or the Revival of Prophecy  and The Psychology of Study.

Awards and honours
President of the Aristotelian Society, 1948-9
President of the Psychological Section, British Association, 1951
President of the British Psychological Society, 1952–53

Literary works 
 Sibylla; or, the Revival of Prophecy. 	1926 
 A Manual of Psychology	1929 
 The psychology of study, etc.	1932. 
 The Principles of Logic. An introductory survey. 	1933 
 Supernormal Faculty and the Structure of the Mind.	1937 
 Current Trends in British Psychology. Edited by C. A. Mace and P. E. Vernon. 1953 
 The Psychological Approach to Scientific Management - can this be applied in the home?	1954 
 British Philosophy in the Mid-Century. A Cambridge symposium. Edited by C. A. Mace. 	1957 
 Selected papers. 	1973.

References

British psychologists
20th-century British philosophers
1894 births
1971 deaths
People educated at the City of Norwich School
Presidents of the British Psychological Society
Presidents of the Aristotelian Society
Alumni of Queens' College, Cambridge
20th-century psychologists